Wild Kingdom, also  known as Mutual of Omaha's Wild Kingdom, is an American documentary television program that features wildlife and nature. It was originally produced from 1963 until 1988, and it was revived in 2002. The show's second incarnation aired until 2011 on Animal Planet in the United States.  A third incarnation streamed webisodes on a dedicated YouTube channel from 2013 to 2018. Starting April 4, 2021, the program is shown in its traditional Sunday timeslot on the cable channel RFD-TV.  Starting in January 2023, a fourth incarnation, Mutual of Omaha's Wild Kingdom: Protecting the Wild, hosted by Peter Gros will begin airing on RFD-TV and various streaming platforms.

Original show

The original Wild Kingdom grew from discussions that started in 1962 between zoologist Marlin Perkins and V. J. Skutt, the chairman and CEO of insurance company Mutual of Omaha. The company had been the sponsor of an earlier animal-related show, Zoo Parade, that Perkins had hosted from 1952 until 1957. Also intimately involved with the creation of Wild Kingdom was Zoo Parade producer Don Meier, who was credited as the program's creator. Mutual of Omaha sponsored and lent its name to the new program.

Wild Kingdom won Emmy Awards for "outstanding program achievement" in 1966, 1967, 1968, and 1969.

Liz and Henk Maartens, from Irene, Pretoria, South Africa, won five Emmy Awards for the documentary program Wild Kingdom in 1970. One Emmy Award was for camerawork while the other Emmy Awards were for aspects of production.

Wild Kingdom was first broadcast by NBC. The half-hour show aired on Sundays starting January 6, 1963, and continued until 1971, when the program entered first-run syndication. As a prime-time syndicated program, Wild Kingdom enjoyed great popularity. Although most of the programs aired after 1971 were repeats, new shows continued to be produced until 1987. Several episodes were filmed by cameraman Roy Pinney. Perkins was the host for most of the show's history until he was forced to retire in 1985 for health reasons, and Jim Fowler, Perkins' long-time assistant and sidekick, became the host. Perkins died of cancer one year later at age 81.

One of Wild Kingdoms film editors, Bernard Braham, was offered membership with the American Cinema Editors in 1979 and won an EDDIE award in Hollywood for best documentary of the year for the episode "Desert Spring". His competition for the award was a National Geographic episode titled "Gold". He was also nominated for several other awards.

Perkins often introduced commercial spots by tying them into the subject of the show. For example, at the end of a segment about lions, he might say something like, "Just as the mother lion protects her cubs, you can protect your children with an insurance policy from Mutual of Omaha..."

The format of the show often featured Perkins narrating off-camera, describing Fowler's on-camera work with the wild animals. This was commonly parodied as Perkins saying "I'll wait here [someplace safe] while Jim [does something or other with the dangerous animal]". However, according to a 1997 interview with Fowler, Perkins never said any such thing: according to Fowler, "Johnny Carson started the jokes about me and Marlin in his monologues".

Perkins often featured pet chimpanzees in the studio: one named "W. K." (Wild Kingdom); the other named "Mr. Moke", after the Mini Moke vehicle.

Wild Kingdom increased ecological and environmental awareness in the United States. Its exciting footage brought the wilds of Africa, the Amazon River, and other exotic locales into the living rooms of millions of Americans. It created an interest in commercial nature programming that led to several other wildlife documentary programs going on the air, including Animal World, Wild, Wild World of Animals and Lorne Greene's New Wilderness, and in subsequent decades, to entire cable television networks devoted to these topics, such as the Discovery Channel and Animal Planet. Many fans of wildlife documentaries still consider Wild Kingdom the "gold standard" against which other such shows are compared.

Mutual of Omaha owns the rights to the program, but several episodes have been released on DVD from BCI Eclipse under license from Mutual of Omaha. Some episodes are also available on an official YouTube channel.

Controversy
The show was criticized in the 1982 investigative piece "Cruel Camera" by The Fifth Estate, a news magazine program on Canada's CBC Television network, for claims of staging scenes of animal capture or "rescue" simply for dramatic effect or theatrical opportunity, which could thus be construed as cruelty or create undue risk to the creatures. Several interviewees who had worked on Wild Kingdom confirmed the rumors that many of the sequences were staged, such as in the episode where Perkins and crew captured a bear in the Florida swamps. In fact, the bear had actually been "placed" there by the production. Perkins denied such allegations on camera, and when interviewer Bob McKeown pressed him, said, ''I'd like you to stop your camera right now, please.''

Revival
In 2002, a completely new Wild Kingdom, also sponsored by Mutual of Omaha, began airing new Wild Kingdom specials on Animal Planet. The specials proved to be so popular that, in 2005, the network began airing new weekly episodes during the original Sunday night timeslot.

Reruns
As of on April 4, 2021, Mutual of Omaha started syndicating the original series to RFD-TV, airing them in the original Sunday night timeslot.  The classic episodes are introduced by new host Peter Gros.

New host and web series

On November 3, 2013, Mutual of Omaha's Wild Kingdom premiered as a series of webisodes that featured new host Stephanie Arne, a new format, and new stories.
 "Reef Madness", featuring coral reefs of the Florida Keys.
 "Where the Buffalo Roam", featuring American bison across the South Dakota plains.
 "Tegu Invasion", featuring tegu in the Florida Everglades.
 "California Condor: Extreme Survival", featuring the California condor's conservation success story.

A second season of new webisodes began in July 2014, and the third season began in March 2015. The fifth and last season was released in 2018.

Third Revival/Fourth Incarnation
On October 20, 2022, it was announced on the program's website and YouTube Channel that a third regular series revival (fourth incarnation) went into production called Mutual of Omaha's Wild Kingdom: Protecting the Wild featuring new host, wildlife expert Peter Gros, who was part of the original Wild Kingdom series.  The new series is set to air in January of 2023 on RFD-TV and select digital platforms.

References

External links
 Official website (site sponsored by Mutual of Omaha)
 Animal Planet Wild Kingdom site
 
 
“Zoo Man,” 1994-12-04, The Walter J. Brown Media Archives & Peabody Awards Collection at the University of Georgia, American Archive of Public Broadcasting 

1960s American anthology television series
1963 American television series debuts
1970s American anthology television series
1960s American documentary television series
1970s American documentary television series
1980s American documentary television series
1988 American television series endings
2000s American documentary television series
2002 American television series debuts
2011 American television series endings
2010s American documentary television series
American television series revived after cancellation
Animal Planet original programming
English-language television shows
First-run syndicated television programs in the United States
Nature educational television series
NBC original programming
Super Bowl lead-out shows
Television series about animals
Discovery Channel original programming